The Canadair CF-5 (officially designated the CF-116 Freedom Fighter) is the Canadair licensed-built version of the American Northrop F-5 Freedom Fighter aircraft primarily for the Canadian Forces (as the CF-5) and the Royal Netherlands Air Force (as the NF-5). The CF-5 was upgraded periodically throughout its service career in Canada. The Canadian Forces retired the type in 1995, although CF-5s continue to be used by other countries.

The CF-5 was ordered by the Royal Canadian Air Force, which became part of the Canadian Forces on 1 February 1968. The new unified force took delivery of the first CF-5s (it was almost universally referred to as the CF-5 except in official documentation) at the end of 1968. Production by Canadair for the Canadian Forces was 89 single-seat aircraft, 46 dual-seat aircraft and 75 single-seat with 30 dual-seat aircraft for the Royal Netherlands Air Force, a total production of 240. Twenty surplus Canadian aircraft were sold to Venezuela.

Design and development

Originally designed by Northrop as a low-cost, low-maintenance fighter jet, the F-5 was intended for use by air forces that had limited resources and technical expertise to maintain a sophisticated aircraft. For Canada, which had an extensive aerospace industry, selection of the F-5 was seen as a step backwards. Selected originally to provide a tactical support role based in Canada, CF-5 squadrons were also committed to NATO's northern flank to act as a rapid-deployment force. However, the role for the CF-5 throughout its service with the RCAF was changed frequently and eventually, the diminutive fighter would serve as a light attack strike fighter, reconnaissance platform and trainer.

Compared to the Northrop F-5, the Canadian CF-5 had several modifications to make it more suitable for operating in Canadian Forces theaters of operations. In order to address complaints about long takeoff runs, the Canadair version featured a two-position nose landing gear; compressed it operated like the original, but extended (before takeoff) it raised the nose and thereby increased the angle of attack and increased lift. The system reduced takeoff distance by almost 20%. A midair refueling probe was installed, Orenda-built General Electric J85-15 engines with 4,300 lbf (19 kN) thrust were used, and a more sophisticated navigation system was added. The nose of the CF-5 was also interchangeable with a specially designed reconnaissance set with four cameras in it. Over the course of its life, it received many upgrades to its avionics and capabilities.

An order for 105 aircraft for the Royal Netherlands Air Force was signed in early 1967, 75 single-seaters to replace the Republic F-84 and 30 twin-seaters to replace the Lockheed T-33. The plan to use some single-seaters for photo-reconnaissance to replace the Lockheed F-104G Starfighters never materialized. Production of the F-5 in Europe was originally planned by Fokker and SABCA, for the Dutch and Belgian Air Forces, but hesitancy by Belgium led to the Netherlands government ordering under a production sharing agreement with Canada. As part of the production sharing agreement between the Canadian and Dutch governments the centre fuselages for all but the first 31 aircraft were built by Fokker in the Netherlands.

The first CF-5 was formally rolled out in a ceremony at the Cartierville factory on 6 February 1968. The first NF-5 was rolled out on 5 March 1969.

Operational history

Canada

Initially 433 Squadron and 434 Squadron were the only two squadrons to operate the CF-5. It was intended that three squadrons would fly the aircraft, but due to budgetary restrictions, the excess aircraft were put into storage in CFB North Bay and CFB Trenton, some later being sold to other countries. 434 Squadron was assigned to do lead-in tactical fighter training for the Canadair CF-104 Starfighter, but was transitioned to the role of a rapid reaction squadron, being ready to deploy to Europe at short notice in the event of hostilities. The squadron moved to CFB Bagotville with 433 Squadron, for a short time, and then on to CFB Chatham.

The training role was adopted by 419 Squadron at CFB Cold Lake; it would continue to provide jet training, dissimilar air combat training (painted in Soviet style "aggressor" schemes similar to USAF, USN and USMC F-5Es), and serve as a lead-in fighter trainer for the McDonnell Douglas CF-18 Hornet until retired in 1995. All remaining airframes were put into storage at CFD Mountain View.

While originally intended to be deployed to Europe, due to budgetary limitations the CF-5 became a rapid deployment reinforcement, to be deployed to central Europe or later Norway in time of war. CF-5s did deploy to Europe for several reasons many times during the Cold War: in 1970 six CF-5As deployed to CFB Baden–Soellingen in Germany, later flying to Norway in early 1971; in 1973 eight CF-5A and CF-5R flew to Norway; in 1974 four CF-5A and CF-5Rs participated in a NATO reconnaissance exercise at Leck, Germany; two Canadair CF-5R visited Leeuwarden, Netherlands in 1974; sixteen CF-5As flew to Europe in 1977; in 1978 eight CF-5As deployed to Norway to participate to NATO's Arctic Express exercise; in 1980 eight CF-5As participated in the Anorak Express exercise in Norway; in 1985 and 1986 CF-5As depolyed to NATO exercises (Brave Lion) in Norway, and finally, the last deployment to Europe was in 1987 when four CF-5As arrived at CFB Baden–Soellingen; in June, 1988 the CF-5A was replaced in the rapid deployment force by the McDonnell Douglas CF-18 Hornet. Additionally, CF-5R photo reconnaissance aircraft participated in Best Focus exercises in Europe during 1978, 1980 and 1985, with a Canadian pilot winning the NATO "Photo Derby" in 1985.

Netherlands
The Royal Netherlands Air Force took delivery of its first aircraft (an NF-5B two-seater) in October 1969, with the first squadron to be formed being 313 Squadron at Twente. The initial role of 313 Squadron was a conversion unit to train pilots on the new type. The NF-5 would serve with four operation squadrons, 313 and 315 Squadron at Twenthe, 316 Squadron at Gilze-Rijen and 314 Squadron at Eindhoven. The last NF-5 was delivered in March 1972.

From 1986 the squadrons began to convert to the licence-built General Dynamics F-16 and the last NF-5 was stood down in March 1991.

Most surplus aircraft were sold to Turkey (most to Turkish Stars) and Venezuela (mix CF-5A and CF-5D - 18 in 1972, 2 new CF-5D in 1974 and 7 ex-RNAF NF-5A/B in 1990; all served with Grupo de Caza 12) or retained for spares support. A dozen aircraft were donated to Greece.

Variants
 CF-5A : Single-seat fighter version for the Canadian Forces, designation CF-116A. 89 built. 13 sold to Botswana and 16 sold to Venezuela.
 CF-5A(R) : Single-seat reconnaissance version for the Canadian Forces. 50 interchangeable camera noses built to swap the CF-5A's twin 20mm cannon nose with a quad 70mm Vinten camera nose. Canadian Forces provisional designation CF-116A(R).
 CF-5D : Two-seat training version for the Canadian Forces, CF-116D. 46 built. 5 sold to Botswana and 4 sold to Venezuela.
 NF-5A : Single-seat fighter version for the Royal Netherlands Air Force. 75 built. 1 sold to Venezuela and 10 donated to Greece.
 NF-5B : Two-seat training version for the Royal Netherlands Air Force. 30 built. 6 sold to Venezuela and 2 donated to Greece.
 VF-5A : Single-seat fighter version sold to Venezuelan Air Force.
 VF-5D : Two-seat training version sold to Venezuelan Air Force.

Operators

Botswana
 Botswana Air Force
 Total of 18 ex-Canadian fighters delivered in 1996 and 2000; (13 CF-5A and 5 CF-5D). All assigned at Z28 Squadron and stationed Maparangwane Air Base. 11 CF-5A and 4 CF-5D were still in use as of 2021.

Turkey
 Turkish Air Force
 19 NF-5A/B 2000 Freedom Fighters were in service as of 2021, used as trainers and flying with 133rd Aerobatic Squadron Turkish Stars.

United States
Tactical Air Support, Inc. 
 In 2013, the company added four Canadair CF-5D Freedom Fighters and 20 years' worth of spare F-5 parts to its fleet.

Venezuela
 Venezuelan Air Force
 Air Group 12 - 6 CF-5A in use as of 2021.

Former operators 
Canada
 Canadian Forces Air Command
 419 Squadron
 433 Squadron
 434 Squadron
Aerospace Engineering Test Establishment
 8 CF-5D aircraft assigned to AETE from 1968 to 1996
 Sale of 28 used Canadian CF-5 offered to Greece, for $75 million, in 2001 was unsuccessful and the aircraft were used for avionics training and the spare parts were scrapped.

Greece
 Hellenic Air Force
 12 NF-5s (10 NF-5As, one NF-5B and one NF-5B for spares) were donated by the Netherlands to Greece in 1991 for use with 349 "Kronos" Squadron. They were withdrawn in 2001.

Netherlands
 Royal Netherlands Air Force 105 NF-5 (75 single and 30 dual seaters) were introduced into service between 1969 and 1972, decommissioned in 1991 
 No. 313 Squadron; Twente Air Base (transitioned to F-16 in 1987)
 No. 314 Squadron; Eindhoven Air Base (transitioned to F-16 in 1990)
 No. 315 Squadron, Operation Conversion Unit (OCU); Twente Air Base (transitioned to F-16 in 1986)
 No. 316 Squadron; Gilze-Rijen Air Base (transitioned to F-16 in 1991)
 Field Technic Training Unit NF-5 (1971–1984); Twente Air Base

Aircraft on display

Air Force Heritage Museum and Air Park, Winnipeg, Manitoba
Atlantic Canada Aviation Museum
Canada Aviation and Space Museum, Ottawa, Ontario
Canadian War Museum Ottawa, Ontario – reconnaissance version
Canadian Warplane Heritage Museum in Hamilton, Ontario
Cold Lake Air Force Museum
CFB Cold Lake - CF-5A '116736' mounted on a pole near the base entrance.
Defence Research and Development Canada – Toronto (DRDC) (mounted on Sheppard Avenue West), Toronto, Ontario
Kamloops Airport
Memorial Military Museum in Campbellford, Ontario (#116730).
National Air Force Museum of Canada, Trenton, Ontario
Reynolds-Alberta Museum, Wetaskiwin, Alberta
The Military Museums Calgary, Alberta
Toronto/Markham Airport 2 located at Markham, Ontario

Europe 
 NF-5A 'K-3003' on display at Gilze-Rijen Air Base, the Netherlands
 NF-5A 'K-3020' on display at Nationaal Militair Museum, former Soesterberg Air Base, the Netherlands
 NF-5A 'K-3068' on display at Eindhoven Air Base, the Netherlands
 NF-5B 'K-4011' in storage at Nationaal Militair Museum, former Soesterberg Air Base, the Netherlands.
 NF-5B 'K-4012' as instructional airframe at Deltion College Zwolle, the Netherlands

Specifications (CF-116)

See also

References

Notes

Bibliography

 McIntyre, Bob. Canadair CF-5 (Canadian Profile: Aircraft No. 4). Ottawa, Ontario: Sabre Model Supplies Ltd., 1985. .
 Pickler, Ron and Larry Milberry. Canadair: the First 50 Years. Toronto: CANAV Books, 1995. .
 Stachiw, Anthony L. Canadair CF-5 Freedom Fighter (Canadian Service Aircraft No.1). St. Catharine's, Ontario: Vanwell Publishing, 2003. .
 Van Gent, C.J. De Northrop NF-5: De geschiedenis van de NF-5 in Nederland. Alkmaar, Netherlands: Uitgeverij De Alk, 1992. .
 Van Gent, C.J. De Northrop NF-5: De historie van de NF-5 bij de Koninklijke Luchtmacht. Odoorn, Netherlands: Uitgeverij Lanasta, 2020. .
 Van Gent C.J. De Starfighter: De geschiedenis van de Starfighter in Nederland. Maarssen, Netherlands: Uitgeverij Geromy, 2012. .

External links

CF-5 (CF-116) Freedom Fighter – Atlantic Canada Aviation Museum

1960s Canadian fighter aircraft
1960s Canadian attack aircraft
CF-005
CF-005
Twinjets
Low-wing aircraft
Aircraft first flown in 1968
Canada–United States military relations